Dalkılıç is a Turkish surname. Notable people with the surname include:

 Hande Dalkılıç (born 1974), Turkish concert pianist
 Murat Dalkılıç (born 1983), Turkish pop singer and composer
 Yasemin Dalkılıç (born 1979), Turkish female free diver

Turkish-language surnames